Víctor Rafael Moya Carvajal (born October 24, 1982, in Santiago de Cuba) is a Cuban high jumper.

Career
Relatively young, he participated in his first major competition in the 2005 World Championships where he cleared 2.29 metres, a new personal best, and won a surprise silver medal along with Yaroslav Rybakov. Two weeks later in Brussels he set another personal best with 2.31 m. At the 2005 World Athletics Final he improved it again to 2.35 metres.

Personal bests
Outdoor
High jump: 2.35 m –  Monaco, 10 September 2005
Indoor
High jump: 2.31 m –  Arnstadt, 3 February 2007

Achievements

References

External links

Tilastopaja biography
Ecured biography (in Spanish)

1982 births
Living people
Cuban male high jumpers
Sportspeople from Santiago de Cuba
Athletes (track and field) at the 2007 Pan American Games
Athletes (track and field) at the 2011 Pan American Games
Athletes (track and field) at the 2012 Summer Olympics
Olympic athletes of Cuba
World Athletics Championships medalists
Pan American Games bronze medalists for Cuba
Pan American Games medalists in athletics (track and field)
Medalists at the 2007 Pan American Games
Medalists at the 2011 Pan American Games
21st-century Cuban people